Cherry Valley Township is a township in Carroll County, in the U.S. state of Missouri.

Cherry Valley Township was named for the cherry trees within its borders.

References

Townships in Missouri
Townships in Carroll County, Missouri